This is a list of flying mythological creatures. This listing includes flying and weather-affecting creatures.

 Adzehate creatures
 Angel
 Arkan Sonney
 Basilisk
 Boobrie
 Cockatrice
 Djinn
 Devil
 Dragon
 Elemental - a being of the alchemical works of Paracelsus
 Erinyes
 Fairies
 Fenghuang
 Fionnuala
 Firebird - large bird with magically luminescent red- and yellow-hued feathers (sometimes used as a synonym of phoenix; see below)
 Fūjin
 Gamayun
 Gargoyle
 Garuda
 German
 Griffin

 Harpy
 Hippogriff
 Huitzilopochtli
 Lamassu
 Lightning Bird
 Lindworm
 Minokawa
 Nephele
 Nue
 Odin's ravens, Huginn and Muninn
 Pegasus - winged horse
 Peryton
 Phoenix
 Raiju
 Roc
 Sarimanok
 Simurgh
 Shahbaz
 Snallygaster
 Sphinx (Greek)
 Stymphalian Birds
 Sylph
 Thunderbird
 Winged Unicorn
 Wyvern
 Yalungur
 Yuki-onna
 Zilant
 Ziz
 Zduhać

See also 

 List of fictional birds
 List of fictional birds of prey

Flying mythological creatures